Wonokromo is a district in Surabaya, Indonesia. The Wonokromo railway station serves the area. The Kalimas River originally turned north and empties into the Tanjung Perak and Kali Jagir, a manmade branch of the river that connects east to the sea and includes a dam built by the Dutch. The area is also home to DTC (Darmo Trade Center) formerly the Wonokromo Market.

Administrative divisions 
Wonokromo is divided into 6 administrative villages:
 Ngagel
 Ngagelrejo
 Darmo
 Sawunggaling
 Wonokromo
 Jagir

Gallery

References

Districts of East Java
Surabaya
Central business districts in Indonesia